Vek may refer to:

 Tom Vek (1981), British musician
 F. L. Věk, historical novel by Czech writer Alois Jirásek
Dolný Vék, Slovakia
Horný Vék, Slovakia